H2onews is a Roman Catholic multimedia production agency established in 2006 with headquarters located at Rome, Italy.

Description 

H2onews creates and distributes multimedia news  about the life of the Church and social or cultural events that directly pertain to Catholics living in the world. The news are produced in nine languages :

 Italian
 English
 Spanish
 French
 Portuguese
 German
 Hungarian
 Arabic
 Chinese

The agency uses an important correspondents network around the world and an assembly/production platform in Rome. After translations and video assembly, the news are uploaded on the internet site or directly sent to the main partners. The videos are also available on the H2onews iPhone application. H2onews is also one of the creators of the Vatican's Channel on YouTube

Project Genesis 
H2onews was born during the First World Congress of Catholic Television in Madrid in October 2006, hosted by the Pontifical Council for Social Communications.
H2onews springs from the Pope’s request to use modern methods of communication for evangelization and promoting peace and development (cfr. World Social Communications Day, May 8, 2005).

Name 
H2O is the chemical formula for water, a vital element. Then, in Christian tradition, water is a symbol of life, purification, salvation and renewal.

Partners 
Catholic information producers or Catholic TV are the main partners of H2onews. The most important are :

 Vatican Television Center
 Vatican Radio
 Salt + Light Television
 Popular television
 KTO
 EWTN
 Cançao Nova

Editorial Philosophy 
H2onews takes a Catholic point of view based on the official position of the Church's authorities.

See also 
Catholic television
Catholic television channels
Catholic television networks

References

External links 
English Page

Catholic television